Dilophodes is a genus of moths in the family Geometridae.

Species
 Dilophodes amplificata Bastelberger, 1905
 Dilophodes auribasis Prout, 1926 = Dilophodes elegans auribasis Prout, 1926 (Borneo)
 Dilophodes baria Prout, 1932 = Pogonopygia pavida baria Prout, 1932 (Borneo)
 Dilophodes contaminata Inoue, 1971 = Pogonopygia pavida contaminata Inoue, 1971 (Japan)
 Dilophodes elegans Butler, 1878
 Dilophodes khasiana Swinhoe, 1892 = Dilophodes elegans khasiana Swinhoe, 1892 (Taiwan)
 Dilophodes pavida Bastelberger, 1911 = Pogonopygia pavida Bastelberger, 1911
 Dilophodes sinica Wehrli, 1939 = *Dilophodes elegans sinica Wehrli, 1939 (China)
 Dilophodes xanthura Prout, 1928 = Pogonopygia pavida xanthura Prout, 1928 (Sumatra, Peninsular Malaysia)

References
 Dilophodes at Markku Savela's Lepidoptera and Some Other Life Forms
 Natural History Museum Lepidoptera genus database

Boarmiini